Anna Mitrofanovna Aníchkova (1868/1869 – 1935) was a Russian writer and translator who published under the pseudonym Ivan Strannik. She wrote fiction in both French and Russian.

Life
Anna Mitrofanovna Avínova was born in the Caucasus. Some sources give 1868 as her year of birth, and others 1869. She married the literary critic E. V. Aníchkov and moved to Paris in the late 1890s, establishing a literary salon there which attracted writers like Anatole France and Vlacheslav Ivanov. She wrote novels in French, and contributed to Revue de Paris, Revue Bleu and Figaro.

In 1909 the couple returned to Russia, and she began writing short fiction for the 'thick periodicals' there. After the Russian Revolution in 1917 she concentrated on translation rather than fiction.

Works

Novels

Others
 (trans.) 
 (trans.)

References

1868 births
Year of birth uncertain
1935 deaths
Russian writers
Russian translators
Russian–French translators
Russian writers in French
20th-century pseudonymous writers
Pseudonymous women writers
Salon-holders